Preston is an unincorporated community in the towns of Fennimore and Wingville, Grant County, Wisconsin, United States.

History
A post office called Preston was established in 1880, and remained in operation until it was discontinued in 1920. The community was named for Matthew Preston, a pioneer settler.

Notes

Unincorporated communities in Grant County, Wisconsin
Unincorporated communities in Wisconsin